Bilyk is a Ukrainian surname derived from a word meaning "white" (білий). It may refer to:

Alfred Bilyk
Catryna Bilyk (born 1959), Australian politician
Jeff Bilyk (born 1977), American association football player
Iryna Bilyk (born 1970), Ukrainian singer
Iryney Bilyk (born 1950), Ukrainian Greek-Catholic hierarch
Luke Bilyk (born 1994), Canadian actor
Nikola Bilyk (born 1996), Austrian handball player
Oleh Bilyk (born 1998), Ukrainian football player
Vera Belik (Ukrainian Bilyk)

See also
Bilyi
 Biłyk

Ukrainian-language surnames